Code poetry is literature that intermixes notions of classical poetry and computer code. Unlike digital poetry, which prominently uses physical computers, code poems may or may not run through executable binaries. A code poem may be interactive or static, digital or analog. Code poems can be performed by computers or humans through spoken word and written text.

Examples of code poetry include: poems written in a programming language, but human readable as poetry; computer code expressed poetically, that is, playful with sound, terseness, or beauty.

A variety of events and websites allow the general public to present or publish code poetry, including Stanford University's Code Poetry Slam, the PerlMonks Perl Poetry Page, and the International Obfuscated C Code Contest.


See also
 Black Perl - A poem in perl
 PerlMonks – New poems are regularly submitted to the community 
 Recreational obfuscation - Writing code in an obfuscated way as a creative brain teaser
 School for Poetic Computation

References

Bibliography
 Francesco Aprile, Code Poems: 2010-2019, Post-Asemic Press (2020). 
 Charles Hartman, Virtual Muse: Experiments in Computer Poetry (Wesleyan Poetry), Middletown, Connecticut: Wesleyan University Press (1996).
 Ishac Bertran, code {poems}, Barcelona: Impremta Badia (2012).

External links
 Daniel Holden & Chris Kerr's multi-lingual code poetry collection
 Francesco Aprile, Computer poems. Dall’archeologia al source code poetry, in Utsanga.it, #09, september 2016
 News Report: First Stanford code poetry slam reveals the literary side of computer code
 Wired Magazine: Code Isn’t Just Functional, It’s Poetic
 GitHub: Leslie Wu's Stanford code poetry slam winning entry
 Francesco Aprile code poetry source since 2010
 Ishac Bertran's code poetry collection from 2012
 ChucKu: 3 lines of code

Poetry movements